The Cubic Kilometre Neutrino Telescope, or KM3NeT, is a future European research infrastructure that will be located at the bottom of the Mediterranean Sea. It will host the next-generation neutrino telescope in the form of a water Cherenkov detector with an instrumented volume of several cubic kilometres distributed over three locations in the Mediterranean: KM3NeT-Fr (off Toulon, France), KM3NeT-It (off Portopalo di Capo Passero, Sicily, Italy) and KM3NeT-Gr (off Pylos, Peloponnese, Greece). The KM3NeT project continues work done under the ANTARES (telescope built off coast of France), NEMO (planned telescope off coast of Italy) and NESTOR (planned telescope off coast of Greece) neutrino telescope projects. 

KM3NeT will search for neutrinos from distant astrophysical sources like supernova remnants, gamma-ray bursts, supernovae or colliding stars and will be a powerful tool in the search for dark matter in the universe. Its prime objective is to detect neutrinos from sources in our galaxy. Arrays of thousands of optical sensor modules will detect the faint light in the deep sea from charged particles originating from collisions of the neutrinos and the water or rock in the vicinity of the detector. The research infrastructure will also house instrumentation for other sciences like marine biology, oceanography and geophysics for long-term and on-line monitoring of the deep-sea environment and the sea bottom at depth of several kilometres.

Once fully completed, the KM3NeT research infrastructure will consist of several large subdetectors. At first, two of these  - together forming the ARCA detector - will indeed form a telescope searching for distant neutrino-sources. Another subdetector  - baptised ORCA - will be optimised to measure the properties of the neutrino itself. In that sense, ORCA is a neutrino particle physics detector.

Design 

In the future and pending funding, the full neutrino telescope will contain on the order of 12000 pressure-resistant glass spheres attached to about 600 strings. In the current phase of construction, the telescope will comprise 345 strings, 230 in the ARCA detector and 115 in the ORCA detector. The strings hold 18 sensor spheres each, anchored to the sea floor and supported by floats. Together, the ARCA and ORCA detector contain 6210 DOMs.

At the shore of each KM3NeT installation site, a farm of computers will perform the first data filter in the search for the signal of cosmic neutrinos, prior to streaming the data to a central KM3NeT data centre for storage and further analysis by the KM3NeT scientists.

The KM3NeT-It site, at a depth of 3400 m, hosts the ARCA (Astroparticle Research with Cosmics in the Abyss) detector, with more widely spaced DOMs optimised for detecting high-energy cosmic neutrinos in the TeV–PeV range.  Its strings are 650 m long, spaced 90 m apart.

The KM3NeT-Fr site, at a depth of 2475 m, hosts the ORCA (Oscillation Research with Cosmics in the Abyss) detector, a more compact array with more closely spaced sensors optimised for atmospheric neutrinos in the GeV range.  This will consist of 115 strings in a 20 m triangular grid, with a 9 m spacing between the DOMs in a string.  Overall, the array is about 210 m in diameter, and the strings are 200 m long.

Construction 
The design of the KM3NeT neutrino telescope is very modular and construction can be phased in time. In 2012, the first phase of the implementation of the KM3NeT research facility has started with the construction of the seabed infrastructure at the KM3NeT-Fr and KM3NeT-It sites. A prototype KM3NeT Digital Optical Module (KM3NeT-DOM) took data successfully in 2014-2015 as part of the ANTARES telescope. The KM3NeT-Fr installation site close to the ANTARES telescope is being prepared for the installation in 2019 of the first strings for the ORCA detector for neutrino particle physics. At the KM3NET-It site the first prototype KM3NeT-string successfully took data for about a year. In 2016 and in 2017, the first full strings of the ARCA detector were installed. In 2018, the seabed cable network was shut down. Early 2019, a temporary fix revived the network and the first string. The cable network at the site is being redesigned for the installation of the two subdetectors of 115 string each for ARCA.  In February 2020, the first phase of the ORCA detector was completed with the installation of the sixth string. Together, ARCA and ORCA form the second phase of construction of KM3NeT.

In addition, a project called SMO will provide KM3Net with acoustic detection (hydrophones), to help with the position monitoring of the strings in water. This technology is also currently being tested for a possible new way of observing neutrinos via acoustic waves.

Relation to other neutrino telescopes 
For the design of the neutrino detector, KM3NeT builds on the experience of three pilot projects in the Mediterranean Sea: the ANTARES detector, the Neutrino Mediterranean Observatory (NEMO) project and the NESTOR Project. The NEMO and NESTOR projects both did research and development work for a neutrino telescope, but said telescopes were never built (apart from some small prototypes). ANTARES telescope was completed on 30 May 2008, and was the largest neutrino telescope in the Northern Hemisphere. In the southern hemisphere, at Antarctica, the IceCube Neutrino Observatory is already operational. Together, IceCube and KM3NeT will view the full sky and form a global neutrino observatory.

Image gallery

References

Further reading

External links
 
 
KM3NeT experiment record on INSPIRE-HEP

Mediterranean Sea
Neutrino astronomy
Neutrino observatories
Particle experiments